Kaster is a village in West Flanders, Belgium. According to the 2005 census it has a population of 803.  The neoclassical St Peter's Church of Kaster, located in the eastern part of the village, dates from 1818.

Geography
Kaster is located in the municipality of Anzegem, located just south of this town along the N32 road.

Politics

Mayors

 1800–1806 Jean-Baptiste Deman
 1806–1821 Jan Standaert
 1821–1827 Petrus Deschietere
 1827–1836 Martin Teirlinck
 1836–1852 Franciscus Detollenaere
 1852–1875 Joannes-Baptista Vandamme
 1875–1882 Petrus-Franciscus Gerniers
 1882–1894 Edward Van Cauwenberghe
 1894–1939 Victor Gerniers
 1939–1946 Maurice Ardenois
 1946–1957 Odon Platteau
 1957–1976 Joël De Stoop

References

Populated places in West Flanders
Anzegem